As Saqlāwīyah is a city in Al Anbar Governorate, in central Iraq. It is located roughly 5 miles (8 km) northwest of the city of Fallujah.

Saqlawiyah is a rural city in between Habbaniyah and Fallujah that sits on the major freeway. The city was named after an Arabian Mare of the Saqlawiyah strain of the Shammar Zawba clan. Due to the canal network that runs through the area, agriculture is an import identity to Saqlawiyans. Due to its proximity to the major freeway, there are many shops along the road that cater to the transient crowds.

ISIL control and recapture
Saqlawiyah came under ISIL control in September 2014 during the Siege of Saqlawiyah, as several hundred Iraqi soldiers were killed.

In 2016, during the Siege of Fallujah and Operation Breaking Terrorism, there was intense fighting in the area between the Iraqi army and ISIL militants. On 29 May, Iraqi troops seized a key bridge between nearby village of Zaghareed and Saqlawiyah in order to facilitate the entry of the security forces from the international highway road into the center of Saqlawiyah.

On 4 June, Iraqi forces captured the town of Saqlawiyah, conducting searches for numerous IEDs left by ISIL. All ISIL militants on board of a raft were killed as they were trying to escape on Euphrates River.

See also 
 2016 Saqlawiyah massacre

Gallery

References

Populated places in Al Anbar Governorate
Populated places on the Euphrates River
Populated places along the Silk Road